Lassina Dao (born 6 February 1971) is a retired Ivorian footballer.

He was a member of the Ivory Coast squad for the 1992, 1994, 1996, 1998 and 2000 Africa Cup of Nations.

External links

1971 births
Living people
Ivorian footballers
Ivory Coast international footballers
1992 African Cup of Nations players
1994 African Cup of Nations players
1996 African Cup of Nations players
1998 African Cup of Nations players
2000 African Cup of Nations players
1992 King Fahd Cup players
Ivorian expatriate footballers
ASEC Mimosas players
Africa Sports d'Abidjan players
Association football defenders
Expatriate footballers in Libya
Ivorian expatriate sportspeople in Libya
Africa Cup of Nations-winning players